"In the Summertime", released in 1970, is the debut single by British rock band Mungo Jerry. It reached number one in charts around the world, including seven weeks on the UK Singles Chart, two weeks on one of the Canadian charts, and number three on the Billboard Hot 100 singles chart in the US. It became one of the best-selling singles of all-time, eventually selling 30 million copies. Written and composed by the band's lead singer, Ray Dorset, while working in a lab for Timex, the lyrics of the song celebrate the carefree days of summer. The track was included on the second album by the band, Electronically Tested, issued in March 1971.

Composition and recording
Dorset has said that the song only took 10 minutes to write, which he did using a second-hand Fender Stratocaster, while he was taking time off from his regular job, working in a lab for Timex.

The song was recorded in Pye Studio 1 with Barry Murray producing. Initially the song was only two minutes long; to make it longer, Murray played the recording twice, slightly remixing the second half, and put the sound of a motorcycle in the middle. In an interview with Gary James, Dorset explained that they couldn't find a recording of a motorcycle, but that "Howard Barrow, the engineer had an old, well, it wasn't old then, a Triumph sports car, which he drove past the studio while Barry Marrit [sic] was holding the microphone. So, he got the stereo effects from left to right or right to left, whatever. And that was it."

Release

The initial UK release was on Dawn Records, a new label launched by Pye. It was unusual in that it was a maxi single, playing at 33 rpm, whereas singles generally played at 45 rpm. It included an additional song also written and composed by Dorset, "Mighty Man," on the A-side, and a much longer track, the Woody Guthrie song "Dust Pneumonia Blues," on the B-side. As the record was sold in a picture sleeve, also not standard at the time, and sold at only a few pence more than the normal 45 rpm two-track single, it was considered value for money. A small quantity of 45 rpm discs on the Pye record label, with "Mighty Man" on the B-side, and without a picture sleeve, were pressed for use in jukeboxes. These are now rare collector's items.

In 2012, Dorset sued his former management company Associated Music International, run by his former friend and business manager Eliot Cohen, claiming over £2 million in royalties from the song that he believed had been withheld from him.

Personnel
Credits adapted from the single liner notes for "In the Summertime".
Ray Dorset – vocals, electric guitar, 6 string acoustic, cabasa, stomp
Paul King – banjo, jug
Colin Earl – piano
Mike Cole – string bass

Charts

Weekly charts

Year-end charts

Certifications and sales

The Mixtures version

In 1970, Australian rock band The Mixtures covered and released the song. The song replaced Mungo Jerry's version at number 1 on the Australian chart, where it remained at number 1 for 6 weeks. It was the biggest-selling single by an Australian artist in Australia in 1970 and number 3 overall.

Weekly charts

Year-end charts

Shaggy version

In 1995, Jamaican-American reggae musician Shaggy covered the song, and released it as the lead single from his third studio album, Boombastic (1995). Aside from the addition of rap lyrics, Shaggy's version also substitutes other lyrics for the song's original line "have a drink, have a drive." Shaggy also performed the song on an episode of Baywatch. A year after its release, the song was re-recorded and released specifically for the film Flipper under the title "In the Summertime" ('96 Version).

Critical reception
Al Weisel from Rolling Stone described "In the Summertime" as "a bouncy, infectious remake of the 1970 Mungo Jerry hit, [that] alternates a soulful chorus with a rapid-fire rap a la Chaka Demus and Pliers' "Murder She Wrote"."

Track listing
United Kingdom
CD single
"In the Summertime" (Single Edit) – 3:46
"It No Matter" – 3:56
"Gal You A Pepper" – 3:37
"In the Summertime" (Sting vs. Shaggy Remix) – 4:40

7" vinyl / Cassette
"In the Summertime" (Single Edit) – 3:46
"It No Matter" – 3:56

12" vinyl
"In the Summertime" (Sting vs. Shaggy Remix) – 4:40
"In the Summertime" (LP Version) – 3:55
"In the Summertime" (Drum Dancehall Mix) – 3:54

1996 "Flipper" CD single
"In the Summertime '96" (Original Version) – 3:52
"In the Summertime '96" (Instrumental) – 3:52
"Flipper Main Theme" – 3:58

United States
CD single
"In the Summertime" (Single Edit) – 3:48
"In the Summertime" (LP Version) – 3:55
"In the Summertime" (Drum Dancehall Mix) – 3:54
"In the Summertime" (Funk Dance Mix) – 3:58
"Boombastic" (LP Version) – 4:05
"Boombastic" (Sting Remix) – 4:18

12" vinyl
"In the Summertime" (LP Version) – 3:55
"In the Summertime" (Drum Dancehall Mix) – 3:54
"In the Summertime" (Funk Dance Mix) – 3:58
"Boombastic" (Sting Remix) – 4:18

Charts

Weekly charts

Year-end charts

Certifications

In other media
The song's lyric "have a drink, have a drive, go out and see what you can find" led to its use in a UK advert for the campaign Drinking and Driving Wrecks Lives. It featured the first verse against people enjoying drinks in a pub during summer, then stopped to show a fatal car accident caused by drink driving. "In the Summertime" has been featured in many feature-length films including 29th Street, Twin Town, The Substitute, Drowning Mona, Mr. Deeds, Stolen Summer, Anita and Me, Wedding Crashers, Wild About Harry, Despicable Me 2, and Dog Days, and X.

See also

List of 1970s one-hit wonders in the United States
List of best-selling singles
List of Billboard number-one rap singles of the 1980s and 1990s
List of Dutch Top 40 number-one singles of 1970
List of number-one singles in Australia during the 1970s
List of number-one singles of 1970 (Canada)
List of number-one singles of 1970 (France)
List of number-one hits of 1970 (Germany)
List of number-one singles of 1970 (Ireland)
List of number-one hits of 1970 (Italy)
List of number-one hits of 1970 (Mexico)
List of number-one singles in 1970 (New Zealand)
List of number-one singles of 1970 (Spain)
List of number-one singles from 1968 to 1979 (Switzerland)
List of number-one R&B singles of 1995 (U.S.)
List of UK Singles Chart number ones of the 1970s
VG-lista 1964 to 1994

References

External links

1970 singles
1970 songs
1995 singles
Dawn Records singles
Dutch Top 40 number-one singles
Irish Singles Chart number-one singles
Mungo Jerry songs
Number-one singles in Australia
Number-one singles in Austria
Number-one singles in France
Number-one singles in Germany
Number-one singles in Italy
Number-one singles in New Zealand
Number-one singles in Norway
Number-one singles in South Africa
Number-one singles in Switzerland
Pye Records singles
RPM Top Singles number-one singles
Shaggy (musician) songs
Skiffle songs
Songs written by Ray Dorset
Song recordings produced by Barry Murray
UK Singles Chart number-one singles
Ultratop 50 Singles (Flanders) number-one singles
Virgin Records singles